Yonah may refer to:
 Yonah is the English transliteration for Jonah (יונה) in Hebrew and means dove.
 Rabbi Yonah Gerondi
 Yonah may be a typo for Yona
 Yonah means bear in Cherokee
 The Yonah (locomotive), one of the four steam locomotives involved in the Great Locomotive Chase during the American Civil War
 Yonah Mountain, a mountain in northern Georgia, United States
 Lake Yonah, on the Georgia – South Carolina border in the United States of America.
 A Jewish bakery in Manhattan called Yonah Shimmel's Knish Bakery that has served fresh, oven-baked traditional Jewish delicacies since 1890
 Yonah (microprocessor), code name for a processor in Intel's Pentium M line, branded Intel Core
 Yonah, Georgia